Dryopithecini  is an extinct tribe of Eurasian and African great apes that are believed to be close to the ancestry of gorillas, chimpanzees and humans. Members of this tribe are known as dryopithecines.

Taxonomy
 Tribe Dryopithecini†
 Kenyapithecus
 Kenyapithecus wickeri
Danuvius
 Danuvius guggenmosi
 Ouranopithecus
 Ouranopithecus macedoniensis
 Ouranopithecus turkae
 Otavipithecus
 Otavipithecus namibiensis
 Oreopithecus 
 Oreopithecus bambolii
 Nakalipithecus
 Nakalipithecus nakayamai
 Anoiapithecus
 Anoiapithecus brevirostris
 Dryopithecus 
 Dryopithecus wuduensis
 Dryopithecus fontani
 Hispanopithecus 
 Hispanopithecus laietanus
 Hispanopithecus crusafonti
 Neopithecus 
 Neopithecus brancoi
 Pierolapithecus
 Pierolapithecus catalaunicus
 Rudapithecus
 Rudapithecus hungaricus
 Samburupithecus
 Samburupithecus kiptalami
 Udabnopithecus
 Udabnopithecus garedziensis
 Griphopithecus
 Griphopithecus alpani
 Griphopithecus suessi
 Graecopithecus
 Graecopithecus freybergi

References

Prehistoric apes
Miocene first appearances
Miocene extinctions
Mammal tribes